Daniel A. Geller is an Australian American pediatrician and psychiatrist who specializes in the treatment of pediatric obsessive–compulsive disorder (OCD). Geller is triple board certified in Pediatrics, Psychiatry, and Child & Adolescent Psychiatry, and is director of the Pediatric OCD Program at Massachusetts General Hospital.

Early life and career
Dan Geller had immigrated to the United States in 1987 to train at the Johns Hopkins University and later became a resident of Johns Hopkins and Stanford University School of Medicines.

Geller is known in the medical community for having assembled the largest repository of OCD genetics ever compiled. He is also described in the nonfiction book Saving Sammy by Beth Maloney as the physician who first started successfully treating Pediatric Autoimmune Neuropsychiatric Disorders Associated with Streptococcal infections (PANDAS) using cognitive behavioral therapy.

Awards
In 2013, Geller was recognized for his "innovative research in the field of obsessive compulsive disorder," as the recipient of an Endowed Chair in Psychiatry at Massachusetts General Hospital.

Bibliography

References

External links
Daniel A. Geller at Rogers Memorial Hospital
Daniel A. Geller at MGH OCD

Year of birth missing (living people)
Living people
American people of Australian descent
Obsessive–compulsive disorder researchers
Massachusetts General Hospital faculty
American pediatricians
American psychiatrists